Erik Erikssønn Bye (March 1, 1926 – October 13, 2004) was a versatile Norwegian-American journalist, artist, author, film actor, folk singer and radio and television personality. He was one of the 20th century's most well-known and popular radio and television figures in Norway.

Born in Brooklyn, New York, to Rønnaug (née Dahl) and opera singer Erik Ole Bye, his family moved home to Norway when he was six years old. After a few years in Ringerike they settled in the Nordstrand borough in Oslo, where they took over a bed and breakfast. In his teens, Bye joined the Norwegian resistance movement during the occupation of Norway by Nazi Germany during World War II. Following the war, he returned to the United States for his university education, studying English, journalism and drama at Midland Lutheran College, Nebraska and the University of Wisconsin in Madison. During his studies he also traveled extensively throughout the United States, taking odd jobs and gathering impressions.

In 1953, Bye took his first job as a reporter with the Associated Press and as a freelancer for the Norwegian Broadcasting Corporation (NRK). In 1955, he moved to London and worked three years at the BBC Overseas Service as an apprentice to Anthony Martin before returning home. Bye enjoyed immense popularity with generations of Norwegians, and his songs and programs on radio and television were magnets to audiences of all ages. He was noted for his gift of being equally comfortable with the King of Norway and a random character met on the street. His roaming reports from around the world ranged from searching America for an old Apache chief to bringing an African chieftain from Ghana who answered a message in a bottle released by NRK to Norway.

Bye was well known for his support of Norwegian sailors. He also spent much time helping the Norwegian Society for Sea Rescue and their cause, raising funds for a brand new rescue ship in 1960, Skomvær II, which was named after the barque Skomvær in Bye's song "Skomværvalsen."  The society also named one of their rescue vessels after the artist.

In 1978 the King of Norway made him a Knight, 1st Class in the Royal Norwegian Order of St. Olav. In 2005 he was voted the third greatest Norwegian of the 20th century by the viewers of NRK, behind King Olav V and Einar Gerhardsen.

Bye was married to politician Tove Billington Jørgensen from 1953 until his death from cancer, which took place in Hvalstad, Asker, Norway.

Filmography
 Reisen til havet (1966) as Hilmar

Discography 
Vi går ombord (1960) 
Erik Bye Synger Skjæraasen (1966) 
Jeg Vet en Vind (1972) 
Gjensyn (1974)
Gammel Er Min Fjord (1974) 
Blow Silver Wind (1976) 
En Dobbel Deylighet (1978) with Birgitte Grimstad 
Norske Folketoner (1978) 
Vandring på Vår Herres Klinkekule (1985) 
Langt Nord i Livet (1994) 
En sang under skjorta- Et Visevalg Fra Skattkammeret (1995)
I dur og brott (2003) with Royal Norwegian Navy Band

References

External links
Erik Bye 1926–2004 – Summary obituary, Aftenposten, October 14, 2004
Erik Bye – sound and audio – From the archive of the Norwegian Broadcasting System (NRK)
Profile of Bye at NRK

1926 births
2004 deaths
University of Wisconsin–Madison alumni
Spellemannprisen winners
People from Brooklyn
Norwegian expatriates in the United States
Norwegian expatriates in the United Kingdom
Associated Press reporters
NRK people
Deaths from cancer in Norway
People from Asker
Norwegian resistance members
Norwegian Army personnel
20th-century Norwegian male singers
20th-century Norwegian singers
Journalists from New York City
20th-century Norwegian journalists